Mount Pleasant is a village in southern Jefferson County, Ohio, United States. The population was 394 at the 2020 census. It is part of the Weirton–Steubenville metropolitan area. Founded in 1803 by anti-slavery Quakers, the village was an early center of abolitionist activity and a well-known haven for fugitive slaves on the Underground Railroad.

History
Mount Pleasant was laid out in 1803. It was named from its scenic landscape. An early variant name was Jesse-Bobtown.

In 1817, Quaker Charles Osborn established The Philanthropist, the first newspaper in the country advocating the abolition of slavery, in Mount Pleasant. The abolitionist James Birney would later adopt the name The Philanthropist for his anti-slavery newspaper, published in Cincinnati and distributed in New Richmond, Ohio beginning in 1836.

In 1821, the Quaker abolitionist Benjamin Lundy started publishing The Genius of Universal Emancipation, another abolitionist newspaper, also in Mount Pleasant. The paper eventually moved to Baltimore, Maryland. Lundy's house is a National Historic Landmark. Most of the village has been designated a historic district, the Mount Pleasant Historic District; it too is a National Historic Landmark.

Geography
Mount Pleasant is located at  (40.175602, −80.799686).

Demographics

2010 census
As of the census of 2010, there were 478 people, 192 households, and 143 families living in the village. The racial makeup of the village was 97.7% White, 0.8% African American, 0.4% Native American, 0.6% Asian, and 0.4% from two or more races. Hispanic or Latino of any race were 0.2% of the population.

There were 192 households, of which 32.8% had children under the age of 18 living with them, 59.9% were married couples living together, 10.9% had a female householder with no husband present, 3.6% had a male householder with no wife present, and 25.5% were non-families. 22.9% of all households were made up of individuals, and 15.1% had someone living alone who was 65 years of age or older. The average household size was 2.49 and the average family size was 2.89.

The median age in the village was 44.5 years. 20.9% of residents were under the age of 18; 6.7% were between the ages of 18 and 24; 23.2% were from 25 to 44; 32.2% were from 45 to 64; and 16.9% were 65 years of age or older. The gender makeup of the village was 48.3% male and 51.7% female.

2000 census
As of the census of 2000, there were 535 people, 201 households, and 158 families living in the village. The population density was 2,136.6 people per square mile (826.3/km2). There were 222 housing units at an average density of 886.6 per square mile (342.9/km2). The racial makeup of the village was 97.57% White, 1.31% African American, 0.37% Asian, and 0.75% from two or more races. Hispanic or Latino of any race were 0.19% of the population.

There were 201 households, out of which 34.8% had children under the age of 18 living with them, 64.2% were married couples living together, 11.9% had a female householder with no husband present, and 20.9% were non-families. 19.9% of all households were made up of individuals, and 14.9% had someone living alone who was 65 years of age or older. The average household size was 2.66 and the average family size was 3.03.

In the village, the population was spread out, with 24.9% under the age of 18, 7.3% from 18 to 24, 26.4% from 25 to 44, 23.4% from 45 to 64, and 18.1% who were 65 years of age or older. The median age was 40 years. For every 100 females there were 96.0 males. For every 100 females age 18 and over, there were 88.7 males.

The median income for a household in the village was $43,750, and the median income for a family was $46,591. Males had a median income of $39,821 versus $19,688 for females. The per capita income for the village was $15,647. About 7.7% of families and 9.3% of the population were below the poverty line, including 12.9% of those under age 18 and 5.0% of those age 65 or over.

Education
Public education in the village of Mount Pleasant is provided by the Buckeye Local School District.

Notable people

 William Lawrence, Republican politician
 Benjamin Lundy, abolitionist
 Stephen Mason Merrill, Methodist clergyman
 Stephen Dee Richards, Old West serial killer
 Benjamin Stanton, sixth lieutenant governor of Ohio
 Jonathan T. Updegraff, physician and politician, served as a U.S. representative from Ohio from 1879 to 1882
 Moses Fleetwood Walker, first African-American professional baseball player

References

Villages in Jefferson County, Ohio
Villages in Ohio
Populated places established in 1803
1803 establishments in Ohio